Thomas Jordan (born 24 May 1981) is a Scottish semi-professional footballer, captain for Conference South side Weston-super-Mare where he plays as a centre back.

Career
In December 2007 he stepped down as Havant and Waterlooville's skipper and missed the historic FA Cup 2nd round proper victory over Notts County as Eastleigh made a second approach for him. Although Jordan played in the ground-breaking 3rd round win against League One leaders Swansea and the 4th round tie at Liverpool he still wanted a move to Eastleigh and spent the rest of the season on the sidelines and negotiations between the two clubs broke down.

In the close-season following the 2007/2008 campaign, he finally completed the move to Eastleigh.
Jordan received the Conference South player of the month in January 2011. In January 2013 he was transfer listed by Eastleigh and he left the club the following month for Conference South rivals Sutton United.

Family
He is the son of the Scottish international footballer Joe Jordan, who was centre-forward for Leeds United during the 1970s, and the brother of Andy Jordan, who made 21 appearances in the Football League.

References

External links

1981 births
Living people
Association football defenders
Footballers from Manchester
Bristol City F.C. players
Southend United F.C. players
Forest Green Rovers F.C. players
Tamworth F.C. players
Havant & Waterlooville F.C. players
Eastleigh F.C. players
Weston-super-Mare A.F.C. players
Scottish footballers
English Football League players